The Swansea Bay Film Festival was a film festival that took place in Swansea, Wales.

Festival mission
This is a festival that promises to "honour the individual voice".  Its goal is to provide a worldwide public forum for independent and experimental film makers and to offer educational outreach. The Swansea Bay Film Festival is a qualifying festival for the British Independent Film Awards.  The Academy of Media, Recording, Interactive, Television and Stage Arts (AMRITSA) are organising the event and the festival's "Special Selection Committee" will comprise seasoned filmmakers, representatives from The City and County of Swansea, The Dylan Thomas Centre, and The Department of Adult and Continuing Education at Swansea University.

Critical response
Director Michael Attardi says, "The Swansea Film Festival is better than Cannes."*  On the other hand, the festival has been described by previous participants as "a sham" and "the worst film festival.". In June 2011 The Guardian headlined the Swansea Bay film festival as a  'disaster'.  Catherine Zeta-Jones has resigned as patron of the Swansea Bay Film Festival and Michael Sheen has resigned as vice president following criticism of the festival. Festival organiser Binda Singh has been singled out for the most criticism.

Winners
2010 - main categories
Best International Documentary:From Ararat to Zion (Armenia)- Edgar Baghdasaryan and Fr Mesrop Aramian
Best International Feature Film: Carmilla Hyde (Australia) - Dave De Vries
Best International Environment and Ecological Film: Poison Wind (USA) - Jenny Pond
Best in the Festival: Shooter (UK) - Ronnie Goodwin

2009 - main categories
Best Documentary: War of the Gods (USA) - Jennifer Abbott
Best International Feature Film: Blue Bus (USA) - Phil Scarpaci
Best Feature Film: Gods of Circumstance (USA ) - Justin Golding
Best in Festival: Jackson (USA) - JF Lawton

2008 - main categories
Best International Short Film: Appassionata (Germany) - Mirko Echghi-Ghamsari

2006 - main categories
Best Feature Film: Footsteps (UK) - Gareth Evans
Best Feature Film Under 75 Minutes - Teenage Wasteland (UK) - Andrew Jones (filmmaker)
Best Short Film (Under 20 Mins) : Tomorrow Never Dais (UK) - Anthony James
Best Noir: The Girl the Gun & the Desert (UK) - Alun D Pughe

References

External links
remotegoat.co.uk, "Swansea Bay Film Festival 2008"
news.bbc.com, June 3 2006, "Swansea premieres film festival"

Film festivals in Wales
Mass media and culture in Swansea
Defunct film festivals in the United Kingdom